Salbutamol/budesonide, sold under the brand name Airsupra, is a fixed-dose combination medication for the treatment of bronchoconstriction and asthma. It is a combination of salbutamol sulfate (albuterol sulfate), a short-acting beta2-adrenergic agonist, and budesonide, an inhaled corticosteroid. It is inhaled using a pressurized metered-dose inhaler.

The most common side effects include headache, oral candidiasis, cough, and difficulty speaking.

Salbutamol/budesonide was approved for medical use in the United States in January 2023. It is the first combination of an inhaled corticosteroid and a short-acting beta-agonist to be approved by the US Food and Drug Administration (FDA). It is the first product containing an inhaled corticosteroid to be approved by the FDA as a reliever treatment (rather than as a controller) for asthma.

Medical uses 
Salbutamol/budesonide is indicated for the as-needed treatment or prevention of bronchoconstriction and to reduce the risk of asthma attacks.

History 
The efficacy of salbutamol/budesonide to reduce the risk of severe asthma attacks was evaluated in participants with moderate to severe asthma in MANDALA (NCT03769090), a randomized, double-blind, multicenter study.

References

Further reading

External links 
 

Antiasthmatic drugs
AstraZeneca brands
Beta-adrenergic agonists
Combination drugs
Glucocorticoids